Gregorio Casal (13 July 1935 – 25 April 2018) was a Mexican actor, best known for his work during the 1960s, 1970s and early 1980s.

Acting 
Pepechuy, as most people called him, changed his name so that there would be no confusion with his brother Mario Casillas who was beginning to become a big name.
Other names he was known by include Gregorio Casal's, Gregorio Casals, Jesús Casillas and Gregorio Cassals.

Filmography 

El méndigo viejo (2002) (V)
Pa' morir nacimos (2002) (as Gregorio Casals)
Agarren al de los huevos (2000) (as Gregorio Casals)
¡Alerta!... La justicia de Rojo (2000)
Cuando hierve la sangre (2000) (V)
La fiera (1999) (as Gregorio Casal's)
El profeta (1999/I)
Siete millones (1999)
Fuera de la ley (1998)
Capo de capos (1998)
Cazador de soplones (1998) (V)
Con sangre de padre (1998) (V)
Traición en Las Vegas (1998) (V)
Pacas de a kilo (1997)
Suburban del diablo (1997) (as Gregorio Casals)
El último cazador (1997)
Yo no necesito claves (1997)
Cruz de madera (1996)
El gatillero de la mafia (1995)
El silla de ruedas 3 (Tienes que morir) (1994)
La sucursal del infierno (1991) (as Gregorio Casals)
La piel de la muerte (1990) .... Jonás
Buscando la muerte (1989)
Deuda saldada (1989)
El fugitivo de Sonora (1989) (as Gregorio Casals)
Me llaman violencia (1989)
Ases del contrabando (1987)
Asesino nocturno (1987) (as Gregorio Casals)
Días de violencia (1987)
Veganza policiaca (1987)
La celda del alacran (1986)
Cicatrices del alma (1986) TV series
Tierra de rencores (1986) (as Gregorio Casals)
Yako, cazador de malditos (1986)
Nana (1985)
Vivir un poco (1985) TV series .... Gonzalo Marcos
Historia de una mujer escandalosa (1984)
Los humillados (1984) (as Gregorio Cassals)
Principessa (1984) TV series
Amalia Batista (1983) TV series .... Augusto
Mercenarios de la muerte (1983) .... Mai Ko
Todos eran valientes (1983)
Déjame vivir (1982) TV series
Oro blanco, droga maldita (1982) .... Hernando Urrego
Toña, nacida virgen (1982)
El héroe desconocido (1981) .... Rigoberto Encinas
El hogar que yo robé (1981) TV series .... Nicolás Aguirre
La pachanga (1981) .... Alejo, the detective
A paso de cojo (1980)
Ambición (1980) TV series
Tetakawi (1980)
Ángel Guerra (1979) TV series .... Ángel Guerra
La sotana del reo (1979) .... Manuel Camacho/Padre Manuel
Las noches de Paloma (1978) .... Abel Mancilla
Pasajeros en tránsito (1978)
María José (1978) TV series (as Gregorio Casals) .... Pablo
Humillados y ofendidos (1977) TV series
El hombre del puente (1976) .... El hombre del puente
Un amor extraño (1975)
Chicano (1975)
Pobre Clara (1975) TV series .... René
Con amor de muerte (1974)
La Choca (1974) .... Martín, el Gaucho
El llanto de la tortuga (1974) .... Sergio
El monasterio de los buitres (1973)
Tu camino y el mío (1973)
Mi primer amor (1973) TV series .... Héctor
Penthouse (1973) TV series
Cuna de valientes (1972)
Cayó de la gloria el diablo (1972)
Chanoc contra el tigre y el vampiro (1972)
La señora joven (1972) TV series .... Octavio Servín
Los dos hermanos (1971)
El ídolo (1971)
The Garden of Aunt Isabel (1971)
Los corrompidos (1971) .... Chema
Sublime reducción (1971) TV series
Emiliano Zapata (1970)
Santo contra los jinetes del terror (1970)
Chanoc en las garras de las fieras (1970) .... Chanoc
Paraíso (1970) (as Jesús Casillas) .... Arcelino
La constitución (1970) TV series
Trampas de amor (1969) (as Jesús Casillas)
De turno con la angustia (1969) TV series
Mi amor por ti (1969) TV series
Sin palabras (1969) TV series .... Christian von Natch
Por mis pistolas (1968) (as Jesús Casillas)
Los caudillos (1968) TV series (as Jesús Casillas)
Los inconformes (1968) TV series

References 

1935 births
2018 deaths
Mexican male film actors
Male actors from Jalisco